Trinity term is the third and final term of the academic year at the University of Oxford, the University of Dublin, Canterbury Christ Church University, and some private schools in the United Kingdom. It runs from about mid-April to about the end of June and is named after Trinity Sunday, which falls eight weeks after Easter, in May or June.

At the University of Oxford, following the resolution made by Council on 8 May 2002, Trinity Term begins on and includes 20 April or the Wednesday after Easter, whichever is later, and ends on and includes 6 July. In Trinity Term, as in Michaelmas Term and Hilary Term, there is a period of eight weeks known as Full Term, beginning on a Sunday, within which lectures and other instruction prescribed by statute or regulation are given. The dates on which each Full Term will begin and end in the next academic year but one are published by the Registrar in the University Gazette during Hilary Term.

At the University of Sydney, it was the second and coldest of the three terms, running from the 24th to the 34th Mondays of the year (late May to early August) in the middle of winter, until Sydney changed over to the two semester system in 1989.

The term is also one of four into which the legal year is divided by the Courts of England and Wales, from 22 May to 12 June, during which the superior courts were formerly open. Trinity term is also used for the sitting of the High Court of Justice of England between 9 June and 31 July also known as Trinity sitting.

Schools
Schools in the United Kingdom and Ireland which use the name 'Trinity term' include:

Barnard Castle School
Berkhamsted School
Brentwood School
Brighton College
Catholic University School
Dean Close School
Exeter Cathedral School
Glenalmond College
Hull Collegiate School
Lincoln Minster School 
Magdalen College School, Oxford
New Hall School
Oswestry School
Queen Anne's School
Royal Grammar School, Worcester
Rydal Penrhos
Sexey's School
Sherborne School
Sherborne School for Girls
St Benedict's School
St Columba's College
The London Oratory School
The King's School, Grantham
Trent College
Wellingborough School
Whitgift School

See also
Michaelmas term
Hilary term
Lent term
Easter term
Summer term

References

Further reading
 
 

Academic terminology
English law
Terminology of the University of Oxford
Educational time organization